Nikolett Szabó (born 3 March 1980 in Budapest) is a javelin thrower from Hungary. Her personal best throw is 64.62 metres, achieved in July 2001 in Patra.

Achievements

References

1980 births
Living people
Hungarian female javelin throwers
Athletes (track and field) at the 2000 Summer Olympics
Athletes (track and field) at the 2004 Summer Olympics
Athletes (track and field) at the 2008 Summer Olympics
Olympic athletes of Hungary
Athletes from Budapest